Sook is a small town and district located in the Interior Division, Sabah, Malaysia. It serves as a timber and agricultural town as well as a transit town for motorists travelling from Keningau to Tawau via the Keningau-Sook-Sapulut-Kalabakan-Tawau road.

Towns in Sabah